The Deputy Assistant Secretary of the Navy for Management and Budget (DASN M&B) is a civilian office in the United States Department of the Navy serving as the principal adviser to the Assistant Secretary for Research, Development and Acquisition on issues involving programming, planning, budgeting, acquisition programmatics, analysis, and Congressional liaison issues.

The current DASN (M&B) is B.J. White-Olson.

References

External links
 DASN (M&B) website

Office of the Secretary of the Navy